"I Go to Rio" is a song written by Peter Allen and Adrienne Anderson, and performed by Allen. It became a signature song of Allen, as well as being covered by Peggy Lee and Pablo Cruise, among others, as well as being included in a number of soundtracks.

History
The song was first released in 1976, on Peter Allen's fourth studio album, Taught by Experts. In 1977, it was successfully released as a single in Australia, where it was Number 1 for five weeks.

Although the song was also released as a single in America, it failed to chart there.

The song has appeared in a number of movie soundtracks, including One Crazy Summer (1986), Dominick and Eugene (1988), The Fabulous Baker Boys (1989), Muriel's Wedding (1994), Hotel Sorrento (1995) and Strange Bedfellows (2004).

The song is also used as the closing number for the Peter Allen biographical musical The Boy from Oz.

The song is also sung on the Disney channel series K.C. Undercover, specifically the episode "Coopers on the Run"

Charts

Weekly charts

Year-end charts

Pablo Cruise cover

Pablo Cruise released their cover of "I Go to Rio" in January 1979.  It reached #46 on the U.S. Billboard Hot 100 and #39 on the Canadian RPM singles chart.

Charts

Other covers
The song was also covered by Peggy Lee on her 1977 album Peggy , as well as by noted French singer Claude François, in French translation ("Je vais à Rio"), that same year. In 1980, it was used on an episode of The Muppet Show. Singers of musical Belles belles belles covered the Claude François' song. In 1982, it was covered by TISM under the name "I Go to Werribee" with slightly different lyrics. In 2008, the song was covered by Australian guitarist Tommy Emmanuel, on his live album Center Stage.

The melody of the opening piano riff of the song has been re-used by Chocolate in "Ritmo de la noche" and subsequent cover versions Mystic, The Sacados, Lorca and Safri Duo, and by Coldplay in "Every Teardrop Is a Waterfall".

References

1976 songs
1977 singles
A&M Records singles
Number-one singles in Australia
Pablo Cruise songs
Songs written by Peter Allen (musician)
Songs written by Adrienne Anderson
Disco songs
Songs about dancing
Songs about Rio de Janeiro (city)